Aşağı Tüləkəran (also, Aşağı Tüləkaran, Ashagy Tyulekiran, Ashagy-Tyulyakeran, and Tyuler) is a village and municipality in the Quba Rayon of Azerbaijan.

References 

Populated places in Quba District (Azerbaijan)